Pentecoste is a municipality in the state of Ceará in the Northeast region of Brazil.

Notable people
Éderson (footballer, born 1989) Football player

See also
List of municipalities in Ceará

References

Municipalities in Ceará